Presbyornithidae is an extinct group of birds with a global distribution. They had evolved by the late Cretaceous period and became extinct during the early Miocene. Initially, they were believed to present a mix of characters shown by waterbirds, shorebirds and flamingos and were used to argue for an evolutionary relationship between these groups, but they are now generally accepted to be waterfowl closely related to modern ducks, geese, and screamers.

They were generally long-legged, long-necked birds, standing around one meter high, with the body of a duck, feet similar to a wader but webbed, and a flat duck-like bill adapted for filter feeding. At least some species were social birds that lived in large flocks and nested in colonies, while others, like the Wilaru species, were terrestrial and solitary.

Several genera have been classified as presbyornithids:
 Presbyornis (type)
 Bumbalavis
 Headonornis (disputed)
 "Styginetta"
 Telmabates Teviornis Proherodius Zhylgaia WilaruThere are some other, undescribed, presbyornithid or possible presbyornithid remains, such as the partial right scapula BMNH PAL 4989, which was considered part of Headonornis hantoniensis'', but cannot be positively refererred to a known taxon, or the Late Cretaceous remains from the Mongolian Barun Goyot Formation at Uday Sayr and the Nemegt Formation of Tsagaan Kushu.

References

External links
 Reconstruction of Presbyornis at pixel-shack.com

 
Prehistoric bird families
Prehistoric birds
Late Cretaceous first appearances
Rupelian extinctions
Tertiary extinctions of vertebrate taxa
Taxa named by Alexander Wetmore